Thomas Denny Sanford (born December 23, 1935, in Saint Paul) is a South Dakota businessman and philanthropist. He is the founder of First Premier Bank and the chairman and chief executive officer of its holding company, United National.

Career
Sanford's first job was at age 8 working in his father's garment shop. He later became a student at the University of Minnesota, intending to become a doctor, but struggled with chemistry and switched majors, eventually graduating with a degree in psychology in 1958. Sanford made his fortune as the owner of subprime credit card providers First PREMIER Bank and PREMIER Bankcard. The bank is known for specializing in a wide range of high-interest, subprime credit cards marketed to people with low credit scores. In 2007, Sanford paid $4.5 million as part of a settlement with the New York Attorney General that alleged deceptive practices in marketing. Premier Bank offered a credit card with a 79.9% interest rate and a $300 limit, an amount cited by Senator Bernie Sanders as an example of "extortion and loan sharking".

In 2018, Sanford ranked #1103 on the Forbes World's Billionaires list, with wealth listed at $2.2 billion.

Personal life and education
Sanford was born on December 23, 1935, in Saint Paul, Minnesota, during the Great Depression. His mother, Edith, died when he was four years old from breast cancer. In his teenage years, he was reportedly arrested for drinking and fighting and placed in a juvenile detention center, released after 36 days on the condition that he enroll in college. Sanford has two sons from his first marriage. In 1987, at age 52, Sanford met his second wife, Colleen Anderson (then 36). They married in 1995 and their divorce was finalized in 2005.

Legal issues 
In 2020, it was reported that Sanford was being investigated for possession of child pornography. Investigators obtained a search warrant before referring the case to the United States Department of Justice. The investigation has led several institutions to reconsider his philanthropy. The investigation was ongoing as of January 2022 at both the state and federal levels.

List of philanthropic gifts
Sanford has pledged to give away his entire fortune during his lifetime, giving financial contributions to various higher education and healthcare institutions without a formal foundation or permanent staff. In 2006, BusinessWeek magazine listed him as one of the 50 most generous philanthropists. As of October 2018, he has donated over $1 billion.

 In 1999, Sanford agreed to match up to $2 million in donations to the Children's Inn and Children's Home Society of South Dakota, which cares for abused and neglected children, through 2002.
 In December 2001, Sanford gave $100,000 to the Sioux Empire United Way to help abused and neglected children. Roundup River Ranch, an affiliate of Paul Newman's Association of Hole in the Wall Camps, in Gypsum, Colorado, received $4 million. 
 In 2006, Sanford donated $70 million to The State of South Dakota's Science and Technology Authority to help secure a deep underground science and engineering laboratory at the former site of the Homestake Gold Mine.
In 2003, Sanford and the University of Minnesota announced that Sanford would donate $35 million toward a proposed new football stadium for the Minnesota Gophers football team, a deal that would have given him full naming rights.  The deal fell through in late 2003 when the parties were unable to reach an agreement on terms of the funding. In 2005, TCF Bank won the bid for the naming rights. 
 In 2004, Sanford announced a gift of $16 million to what became Sanford Children's Hospital. Children's care was one of the five centers of excellence at what was then Sioux Valley Medical Center. The University of South Dakota School of Medicine was renamed the Sanford School of Medicine of the University of South Dakota after the donation. The William Sanford Welcome Center at Bethesda Hospital in St. Paul and the T. Denny Sanford Pediatric Center at the Mayo Clinic were also later named following sizeable donations from Sanford.
On February 3, 2007, Sanford announced a $400 million gift to Sioux Valley Hospitals and Health System, which renamed itself Sanford Health. The gift was featured on The Chronicle of Philanthropy "Philanthropy 50: Americans Who Gave the Most in 2007." 
 In 2008, Sanford founded the Sanford Harmony Program at Arizona State University's T. Denny Sanford School of Social and Family Dynamics. The San Diego Consortium for Regenerative Medicine in La Jolla, California received $30 million, changing its name to the Sanford Consortium for Regenerative Medicine.
 In 2009, Sanford made a $6 million donation to help fund the TCF Bank Stadium on the University of Minnesota campus. He also gave $100 million to create a breast cancer foundation in memory of his mother. The University of Minnesota accepted a $6 million donation to name the athletic hall of fame within TCF Bank Stadium for Sanford. 
 In 2010, Sanford's gift to Mary Lou Fulton Teachers College established the Sanford Inspire Program for teacher preparation at Arizona State University. ASU and National University housed the program concurrently until 2017, after which it was hosted exclusively by National University. The Burnham Institute for Medical Research in La Jolla, California, and Orlando, Florida, received $50 million in 2010, which was followed by a name change to Sanford-Burnham Medical Research Institute. 
 Sanford was named Philanthropist of the Year in 2011 by the Arizona State University Alumni Association.
 In 2013, Physics Today reported that Sanford gave $70 million to a physics lab in the defunct Homestake Mine in South Dakota, renamed the Sanford Underground Research Facility. The University of California, San Diego also announced a $100 million gift from Sanford for the creation of the Sanford Stem Cell Clinical Center at UCSD, the second-largest donation in the university's history. Sanford pledged $10 million to the Crazy Horse Memorial in South Dakota following a $10 million matching pledge made by Sanford in 2007.
 In 2014, Sanford gave $125 million to Sanford Health to create the Imagenetics program. He also gave $1 million to National University to create the Sanford Education Center. He later founded The Sanford Institute of Philanthropy at John F. Kennedy University that month via a $28 million donation to the National University System for initiatives within the Sanford Education Center. The National University's School of Education was renamed the Sanford College of Education after the donation. The Denny Sanford PREMIER Center in Sioux Falls, South Dakota, was also named after donations from Sanford. 
 In 2018, Sanford founded an endowment within the Horatio Alger Fund of $30 million for college scholarships to students who have faced significant financial or healthcare obstacles in their education. He also donated $30 million toward a remodeling of the San Diego Children's Zoo.
 In 2018, Sanford donated $1 million to support an endowment for Ava’s House by Sanford, a multigenerational hospice facility that offers one of only four in-patient hospice programs for children and young adults.
 In 2019, Sanford donated $350 million to National University in addition to $150 million he had given previously. In honor of the donation, National University announced in 2019 that it would change its name on July 1, 2020 to Sanford National University, but the name change was placed on hold after Sanford became subject of a South Dakota child pornography investigation
 In 2019, Sanford donated $25 million to support PHASeR (PHArmacocgenomic testing for Veterans), a program Sanford Health created in partnership with the US Department of Veteran Affairs that offers VA patients free pharmacogenetic (PGx) testing.
 In 2021, Sanford donated $300 million to Sanford Health to expand opportunities in graduate medical education and community health and wellness, positioning Sanford Health as a global leader in rural care delivery.
 In 2021, Sanford donated $350 million to Sanford Health to create one of the world’s leading virtual care centers, with a focus on providing more accessible care in rural and underserved areas of the Midwest.

See also
 List of people from South Dakota
 List of University of Minnesota people

References

1935 births
20th-century American businesspeople
21st-century American businesspeople
American chairpersons of corporations
American chief executives of financial services companies
American financial company founders
American philanthropists
American bank presidents
Businesspeople from South Dakota
Giving Pledgers
21st-century philanthropists
Living people
Patrons of schools
Businesspeople from Saint Paul, Minnesota
University of Minnesota College of Liberal Arts alumni